Charles Chalmers Bryce (16 April 1848 – 12 February 1895) was a Scottish rugby union international who represented Scotland in the 1873–74 Home Nations rugby union matches.

Bryce played as a forward for Glasgow Academicals.

Bryce represented Glasgow District against Edinburgh District in the world's first provincial match, the 'inter-city', on 23 November 1872.

Bryce also represented Glasgow District against Edinburgh District in the 5 December 1874 match.

Bryce played in both Home Nations matches in the 1873-74 season against England; home and away. His debut was the away match on 3 March 1873 at Glasgow. His only subsequent cap for Scotland was in the away match on 23 February 1874.

References

1848 births
1895 deaths
Rugby union players from Glasgow
Scottish rugby union players
Scotland international rugby union players
Rugby union forwards
Glasgow District (rugby union) players
Glasgow Academicals rugby union players